A UK parliamentary by-election was held for one of the two seats in Birmingham on 23–25 January 1840. The Radical candidate George Muntz was returned, ahead of Conservative Charles Wetherell.

Nominations
The vacancy was caused by the 1839 resignation of Thomas Attwood, who was a Radical like the other sitting MP Joshua Scholefield. The returning officer was Philip Henry Muntz, the mayor of Birmingham and brother of George Muntz.  Nomination day was fixed as 23 January, and in the runup both George Muntz and another Radical, Joseph Sturge, canvassed and took part in hustings.  Sturge said that if he lacked support he would withdraw, to avoid splitting the Radical vote. "Mr. Allen, the Whig" withdrew from the hustings. Wetherell's supporters told the mayor that their candidate, as yet unnamed, intended to run. The mayor consulted the three prospective candidates' representatives and on 22 January the municipal corporation contracted for erection of 15 polling booths. At the nomination meeting all three prospective candidates were proposed and seconded; only Muntz attended in person. There was a show of hands of those present, described by The Spectator:
There was a large show of hands for Mr. Sturge, a much larger for Mr. Muntz, but for Sir Charles Wethereil scarcely a hand in the body of the Hall was held up. Mr. George Edmonds, who proposed Mr. Sturge, then stated, that as the decision of the meeting was against Mr. Sturge, he was authorized to withdraw that gentleman from the contest; and he hoped this proof of Mr. Sturge's magnanimity would have the effect of uniting all the Liberals against the common enemy. The show of hands being pronounced in favour of Muntz, a poll for Wetherell was demanded.

Polling was the following day, 24 January, and the result was announced early on 25 January.

Result

Muntz v. Sturge
The corporation billed each of the three prospective candidates for one-third of the £360 expenses. Sturge paid only the £66 proportion which he judged accrued prior to the commencement of the poll.  The mayor sued for the balance, and Nicholas Conyngham Tindal, the Chief Justice of the Common Pleas, agreed at the Warwickshire assizes, but this was overturned on appeal by James Scarlett, 1st Baron Abinger, the Chief Baron of the Exchequer, who ruled that Sturge was not a "candidate at a contested election" in the relevant section of the Reform Act 1832, and thus the other two candidates were liable for the expenses incurred during the poll.

References

 

By-elections to the Parliament of the United Kingdom in Warwickshire constituencies
By-elections to the Parliament of the United Kingdom in Birmingham, West Midlands constituencies
1840 in England
1840 elections in the United Kingdom
19th century in Birmingham, West Midlands
19th century in Warwickshire